Moon River was a long-running late-night American radio program which originated from WLW in Cincinnati, Ohio.  A combination of soft, "dreamy" music and romantic poetry set to organ accompaniment, the program aired from 1930 to 1970.

History
Described as "one of the few programs designed to put people to sleep" by onetime announcer Bill Myers, Moon River was created by writer Ed Byron at the behest of WLW station owner Powel Crosley, Jr., who ordered the writer to come up with a poetry show which could accommodate the station's new organ. Retreating to a speakeasy with violinist Virginio Marucci, Byron sketched out some notes, including his  original poem that opened the show.  At one point, Marucci began playing Fritz Kreisler's "Caprice Viennois," a piece which Byron's poem brought to mind.  Both the poem and the musical piece would open the program for its entire forty-year history. 

A show with a loyal following over the years, Moon River was canceled by WLW in 1953 in an effort to modernize the schedule, but revived the next summer due to continued listener outcry.   In the decade after the program's final broadcast in 1970, a series of Moon River concerts were held in Cincinnati which recreated the program in front of a live audience.

In 1969, the show was cut back to Saturday nights only, due to conflicts with the Cincinnati Royals and the fact that Jim LaBarbara's contemporary music show aired from 7 pm to midnight. A Cincinnati Enquirer article from 1970 said that the show had ended shortly thereafter.

In 1995, WMKV revived it, with Myers as narrator, for a four-year run.

Personnel
Many performers passed through Moon River over the years.  The following is only a partial list.

Announcers
 Arthur R. Ainsworth 
 Bob Brown (the first narrator, c. 1930)
 Don Dowd
 Cecil Hale
 Harry Holcombe
 Jay Jostyn 
 Jimmy Leonard
 Ken Linn
 Bill Myers
 Peter Grant
 Palmer Ward
 Charles Woods
 Steve Ziegler

Vocalists
 Phil Brito
 Barbara Cameron
 Janette Davis
 Allison Lerer
 Doris Day
 The DeVore Sisters (Marjorie, Billie, and Ruth)
 Rosemary and Betty Clooney
 Anita Ellis
 Lucille Norman
 Juanita Vastine aka Sweet Georgia Brown
 Ruby Wright

Organists
 Charles M. "Pat" Gillick (the first organist, c. 1930)
 Fats Waller (c. 1932–1934)
 Lee Erwin (1933–1944)
 Herschel Luecke (1950's)

References

External links
 1940s-era Moon River at the Internet Archive.
 The Moon River Organ
 Article about Moon River revival at KSVY, Sonoma, CA

1930 radio programme debuts
1970 radio programme endings
American classical music radio programs
1930s American radio programs
1940s American radio programs
1950s American radio programs
1960s American radio programs
Music of Cincinnati